Melissa Barrera Martínez (born 4 July 1990) is a Mexican actress and singer. In Mexico, she is known for roles in the telenovelas Siempre tuya Acapulco (2013), Tanto amor (2015), and the Netflix series Club de Cuervos (2017). Outside of Mexico, she is known for her lead roles in the Starz drama series Vida (2018–2020), the musical film In the Heights (2021), the Netflix series Keep Breathing (2022), and the slasher films Scream (2022) and Scream VI (2023).

Early life
Barrera was born and raised in Monterrey, Mexico. She studied musical theater at New York University Tisch School of the Arts.

Career

Music
She attended the American School Foundation of Monterrey where she appeared in the school's musical productions including Grease, Aida and Footloose. Her television debut was on the Mexican reality show La Academia in 2011, where she showed off her talent for singing. In 2013, she was part of the duet Melissa y Sebastian, with whom she recorded her first album and had her first top ten radio hit with their debut single "Mamma Maria", a cover of Ricchi e Poveri's song from the 1980s. In 2015, she recorded the theme song "Volver a caer" alongside the Mexican singer Kalimba, for her telenovela Tanto amor.

Acting

In 2010, while still in college (New York University), she participated in the film L for Leisure. In 2012, she participated in two telenovelas, La mujer de Judas and La otra cara del alma. In 2014, she obtained her first starring role in the telenovela Siempre tuya Acapulco. In 2015, she starred in the last telenovela produced by TV Azteca, Tanto amor. Barrera was cast in the lead role of Lyn on the Starz drama series Vida in 2018.

In August 2020, Barrera was cast as Sam Carpenter on the fifth Scream film, which was directed by Matt Bettinelli-Olpin and Tyler Gillett. The film was released on 14 January 2022.

In 2021, Barrera starred as Vanessa, an aspiring fashion designer and love interest of the narrator, Usnavi, in the Jon M. Chu directed musical film In the Heights, an adaptation of Lin-Manuel Miranda's stage musical. The film earned widespread critical acclaim, with Monica Castillo of The Wrap praising Barrera's performance: "Vanessa's upbeat salsa anthem, 'It Won't Be Long Now', is perhaps one of the more underrated sequences: It's an impressive showcase for Barrera's talents, giving her a wide range of emotions to move through in one number and one of the few moments in the musical to belt out."

In 2022 she starred in Keep Breathing, a six episode survival drama released on Netflix on 28 June 2022.

In 2022, Barrera appeared in the title role in the film musical Carmen directed by Benjamin Millepied. It had its world premiere at the 2022 Toronto International Film Festival on 11 September 2022.

Personal life
Barrera married longtime boyfriend and musical artist Paco Zazueta, in February 2019. The pair first met on the set of La Academia in 2011, and performed a rendition of Enrique Iglesias' "Cuando Me Enamoro" for its fourth episode. They shortly began dating in September of that year. The pair announced their engagement via Instagram in June 2017.

Public image 
Following her roles in horror media in 2022, Barrera was crowned a scream queen.

Filmography

Film

Television

Music videos

Awards and nominations

References

External links
 

1990 births
Living people
People from Monterrey
Mexican telenovela actresses
21st-century Mexican actresses
Actresses from Monterrey
21st-century Mexican singers
21st-century Mexican women singers
Tisch School of the Arts alumni